The men's +105 kilograms event at the 2010 Asian Games took place on 19 November 2010 at Dongguan Arena.

Schedule
All times are China Standard Time (UTC+08:00)

Records

Results

New records
The following records were established during the competition.

References
Results at iwf.net

External links 
 Results 

Weightlifting at the 2010 Asian Games